Bonfires on the Heath is the fifth studio album by English indie pop group The Clientele. The album was released on 6 October 2009 by Merge Records in the United States and on 16 November 2009 by Pointy Records in the United Kingdom.

A detail from Flora by the 16th century surrealistic painter Giuseppe Arcimboldo is used as the album's cover art.

Critical reception

In a review of Bonfires on the Heath, AllMusic referred to the album as "the most perfect, autumnal, English pop record imaginable."

Track listing

Personnel
Credits for Bonfires on the Heath adapted from album liner notes.

The Clientele
 Alasdair MacLean – vocals, whispering, acoustic guitar, slide guitar, Spanish guitar, Jazzmaster and Telecaster guitars
 James Hornsey – bass, backing vocals
 Mark Keen – drums, percussion, piano, backing vocals, trumpet arrangements
 Mel Draisey – violin, piano, Hammond organ, Rhodes piano, glockenspiel, backing vocals, string arrangements

Additional musicians
 Nikki Gleed – violin (1st)
 John Hoare – trumpet
 Brian O'Shaughnessy – electronic tambura
 Sarah Squires – violin (2nd)
 Hannah Stewart – cello
 Charlie Stock – viola

Production
 Jeff Lipton – mastering
 Brian O'Shaughnessy – production
 Maria Rice – mastering (assistant)

Artwork and design
 Maggie Fost – design
 Giuseppe Arcimboldo – artwork
 Federico Vinciolo – artwork

Charts

References

External links
 
 

2009 albums
The Clientele albums